The Tatuus F4-T421 is an open-wheel formula race car, designed, developed and built by Italian manufacturer Tatuus, for Formula 4 junior categories, since 2021.

History
In January 2021, it was first announced that the car would go into production to make its competitive debut in the 2022 Formula 4 UAE Championship, as the successor of the Tatuus F4-T014, featuring the introduction of the halo, and other improved safety features. Over the course of 2021, many Formula 4 championships announced their intent to use the car in the 2022 season: the Italian F4 Championship, F4 British Championship, F4 Spanish Championship, Formula 4 UAE Championship, F4 Indian Championship, F4 Brazilian Championship, ACCR Formula 4 Championship and ADAC Formula 4.

The car first began testing in September 2021. The car made its competition debut in the 2022 Formula 4 UAE Championship, and featured in the 2022 seasons of all announced championships excluding the ACCR Formula 4 Championship, which was postponed due to global supply chain issues.

Championships

References

External links
 Tatuus website
 

Open wheel racing cars
Cars introduced in 2021
Formula 4